Gustavo Miguel Zapata (born 15 October 1967 in Saladillo) is a retired Argentine footballer who played as a midfielder. He played for the Argentina national team at the 1991 Copa América in Chile, the 1993 Copa América in Ecuador, and in 1998 FIFA World Cup qualification.

Coaching career
In the 2002/03 season, Zapata was the assistant manager of Néstor Gorosito at Nueva Chicago. In December 2004, he followed Gorosito when he was appointed as manager of Club Atlético Lanús.

In December 2008, the duo was appointed in River Plate. In 2011, he was once again appointed as assistant manager of River Plate, this time under manager Matías Almeyda. A half year later, he was appointed as the manager of Independiente Rivadavia. He was fired on 25 February 2019, after the team conceded 10 goals in two games.

In November 2012, Zapata took over the reserve team of River Plate. From May 27 to May 30, Zapata was the caretaker manager of River Plate following the departure of Ramon Diaz. On 11 February 2015, Zapata and his staff was surprisingly fired.

In the summer 2015, Zapata was then appointed as the manager of Racing Club's reserve team.

In December 2015, Néstor Gorosito was appointed as manager of Spanish club UD Almería and took Zapata with him as his assistant. On 12 February 2019, Zapata was appointed as the assistant manager of Néstor Gorosito at Tigre.

Career statistics

Club

International

Honours

International
Argentina
Copa América Champions : 1991, 1993

References

External links

1967 births
Living people
Sportspeople from Buenos Aires Province
Argentine footballers
Argentine expatriate footballers
Club Atlético River Plate footballers
Yokohama F. Marinos players
San Lorenzo de Almagro footballers
Chacarita Juniors footballers
Club Atlético River Plate managers
Expatriate footballers in Japan
J1 League players
Argentina international footballers
1991 Copa América players
1993 Copa América players
1997 Copa América players
Argentine Primera División players
Copa América-winning players
Association football midfielders
Argentine football managers